Jennifer Ruth Butler is a basketball player who was selected by the Cleveland Rockers in the 2003 WNBA Draft. She is the first player from UMass to be drafted by a WNBA franchise.

Massachusetts statistics

Source

References

External links
UMass profile
Atlantic 10 Conference legends – 2015 Women's basketball class

1981 births
Living people
Basketball players from New York City
Sportspeople from Brooklyn
Centers (basketball)
UMass Minutewomen basketball players
American men's basketball players
Murry Bergtraum High School alumni